Tejen Kola-ye Sofla (also Romanized as Tejen Kolā-ye Soflá; also known as Tejen Kolā) is a village in Kelarestaq-e Sharqi Rural District, in the Central District of Chalus County, Mazandaran Province, Iran. At the 2006 census, its population was 457, in 111 families.

References 

Populated places in Chalus County